Five Wounds Portuguese National Church is parish church of the Latin Church of the Roman Catholic Church in San Jose, California, in the Little Portugal neighborhood of East San Jose. The church was founded on November 8, 1914.

The parish and its church are under the jurisdiction of the Roman Catholic Diocese of San Jose in California and Bishop Oscar Cantú.

History

Its name is derived from the Five Holy Wounds -- the five piercing wounds that Jesus Christ suffered during his crucifixion.

Located at 1375 East Santa Clara Street in San Jose (just off U.S. Highway 101), the Portuguese National Church of Five Wounds are the heart and soul of Little Portugal. On November 16, 1913, Portuguese residents of San Jose purchased the land that became the site of Five Wounds. However, it was not until 1914 that the parish was created. In collaboration with Mr. Manuel Teixeira de Frietas, the Portuguese community asked Archbishop Patrick Riordan for the blessing to build a church. The blessing was given and in 1914 “we opened the house that today is the parish residence and the first bazaar in benefit of the church.” But in 1915, through a petition signed by the Portuguese residence of San Jose, the Archdiocese of San Francisco officially approved the parish as the National Church of Portuguese of Five Wounds. Timber and wood from the Portuguese Pavilion that was in display in the Panama Pacific International Exposition in San Francisco in 1915 was used to build the church.  The building material, which was brought over from Portugal to build the Portuguese Pavilion, was transported by wagon through the Camino Real. On the 15th of November “Msgr. Henrique A. Ribeiro celebrated the first mass as pastor of the new parish.”

References

External links
 Five Wounds Portuguese National Church
 Roman Catholic Diocese of San Jose

Roman Catholic Diocese of San Jose in California
Roman Catholic churches in California
Roman Catholic churches in San Jose, California
Culture of San Jose, California
Churches in Santa Clara County, California
National parishes
Portuguese-American culture in California
1914 establishments in California